The development of Indian logic dates back to the anviksiki of Medhatithi Gautama (c. 6th century BCE); the Sanskrit grammar rules of Pāṇini (c. 5th century BCE); the Vaisheshika school's analysis of atomism (c. 6th century BCE to 2nd century BCE); the analysis of inference by Gotama (c. 6th century BC to 2nd century CE), founder of the Nyaya school of Hindu philosophy; and the tetralemma of Nagarjuna (c. 2nd century CE).

Indian logic stands as one of the three original traditions of logic, alongside the Greek and the Chinese logic. The Indian tradition continued to develop through early to modern times, in the form of the Navya-Nyāya school of logic.

Origins

The Nasadiya Sukta of the Rigveda (RV 10.129) contains ontological speculation in terms of various logical divisions that were later recast formally as the four circles of catuskoti: "A", "not A", "A and 'not A'", and "not A and not not A".

Medhatithi Gautama (c. 6th century BCE) founded the anviksiki school of logic. The Mahabharata (12.173.45), around the 4th century BCE to 4th century CE, refers to the anviksiki and tarka schools of logic.  (c. 5th century BCE) developed a form of logic (to which Boolean logic has some similarities) for his formulation of Sanskrit grammar. Logic is described by Chanakya (c. 350-283 BCE) in his Arthashastra as an independent field of inquiry anviksiki.

The schools

Vaisheshika

Vaisheshika, also Vaisesika, (Sanskrit: वैशेषिक) is one of the six Hindu schools of Indian philosophy. It came to be closely associated with the Hindu school of logic, Nyaya. Vaisheshika espouses a form of atomism and postulates that all objects in the physical universe are reducible to a finite number of atoms. Originally proposed by Kanāda (or Kana-bhuk, literally, atom-eater) from around the 2nd century BCE.

Catuskoti

In the 2nd century, the Buddhist philosopher Nagarjuna refined the Catuskoti form of logic. The Catuskoti is also often glossed Tetralemma (Greek)  which is the name for a largely comparable, but not equatable, 'four corner argument' within the tradition of Classical logic.

Nyaya

Nyāya (ni-āyá, literally "recursion", used in the sense of "syllogism, inference") is the name given to one of the six orthodox or astika schools of Hindu philosophy — specifically the school of logic.

The Nyaya school of philosophical speculation is based on texts known as the Nyaya Sutras, which were written by Gotama in around the 2nd century CE. The most important contribution made by the Nyaya school to modern Hindu thought is its methodology. This methodology is based on a system of logic that has subsequently been adopted by most of the other Indian schools (orthodox or not), much in the same way that Western philosophy can be said to be largely based on Aristotelian logic.

Followers of Nyaya believed that obtaining valid knowledge was the only way to obtain release from suffering. They therefore took great pains to identify valid sources of knowledge and to distinguish these from mere false opinions. According to the Nyaya school, there are exactly four sources of knowledge (pramanas): perception, inference, comparison and testimony. Knowledge obtained through each of these can, of course, still be either valid or invalid. As a result, Nyaya scholars again went to great pains to identify, in each case, what it took to make knowledge valid, in the process creating a number of explanatory schemes. In this sense, Nyaya is probably the closest Indian equivalent to contemporary analytic philosophy.

Jain logic

Jainism made its own unique contribution to this mainstream development of logic by also occupying itself with the basic epistemological issues, namely, with those concerning the nature of knowledge, how knowledge is derived, and in what way knowledge can be said to be reliable.  Jain logic developed and flourished from 6th century BCE to 17th century CE. According to Jains, the ultimate principle should always be logical and no principle can be devoid of logic or reason. Thus one finds in the Jain texts, deliberative exhortations on any subject in all its facts, may they be constructive or obstructive, inferential or analytical, enlightening or destructive. The Jains have doctrines of relativity used for logic and reasoning:
Anekāntavāda – the theory of relative pluralism or manifoldness;
Syādvāda – the theory of conditioned predication and;
Nayavāda – The theory of partial standpoints.

These Jain philosophical concepts made most important contributions to the ancient Indian philosophy, especially in the areas of skepticism and relativity.

Following is the list of Jain philosophers who contributed to Jain Logic:
Kundakunda (2nd century CE), exponent of Jain mysticism and Jain nayas dealing with the nature of the soul and its contamination by matter, author of Pañcāstikāyasāra (Essence of the Five Existents), the Pravachanasāra (Essence of the Scripture) and the Samayasāra (Essence of the Doctrine).
Umāsvāti or Umasvami (2nd century CE), author of first Jain work in Sanskrit, Tattvārthasūtra, expounding the Jain philosophy in a most systematized form acceptable to all sects of Jainism.
Siddhasena Divākara (5th century CE), Jain logician and author of important works in Sanskrit and Prakrit, such as, Nyāyāvatāra (on Logic) and Sanmatisūtra (dealing with the seven Jaina standpoints, knowledge and the objects of knowledge)
Haribhadrasuri (8th century CE), a Jaina thinker, author and great proponent of anekāntavāda and classical yoga, as a soteriological system of meditation in Jaina context. His works include  and Yogabindu.
Aacharya Hemacandra (1089–1172 CE) - a Jaina thinker, author, historian, grammarian and logician. His works include Yogaśāstra and Trishashthi Shalaka Purusha charitra.
Mahopadhya Yaśovijayaji (1624–88 CE) – Jain logician and considered as intellectual giant to contribute to Jaina philosophy.
Acharya Mahapragya (1920–2010 CE);– Jain logician and considered as intellectual giant and encyclopedia to contribute to Jaina philosophy. The Eminent Scholar of Philosophy, Dr. Daya Krishna has recognized Acharya Shri Mahapragya as the most knowledgeable person on the subject of Jain Logic. His Book "New Dimensions in Jaina Logic" is the one of the best work on the subject in modern era. Acharya Mahapragya is known for his enlightening discourses. In 1975, he was specially invited to deliver a series of nine lectures on Jain Logic at the University of Rajasthan at Jaipur. The University published these lectures in the form of a book entitled ‘Jain Nyay Ka Vikas’. His books on the subjects mainly include ‘Jain Darshan-Mannan aur Mimansa’, ‘Jain Dharma Aur Sanskriti’, ‘Jain Darshan and Anekantvad’, ‘Jain Dharma aur Darshan’, and many more.

Buddhist logic

Indian Buddhist logic (called Pramana) flourished from about 500 CE up to 1300 CE.  The three main authors of Buddhist logic are Vasubandhu (400–800 CE), Dignāga (480–540 CE), and Dharmakīrti (600–660 CE). The most important theoretical achievements are the doctrine of Trairūpya (Skrt. त्रैरूप्य) and the highly formal scheme of the Hetucakra (Skrt. हेतुचक्र) ("Wheel of Reasons") given by Dignāga. There is still a vibrant living tradition of Buddhist logic in the Tibetan Buddhist traditions, where logic is an important part of the education of monks.

Navya-Nyaya

The Navya-Nyāya or Neo-Logical darśana (school) of Indian philosophy was founded in the 13th century CE by the philosopher Gangesha Upadhyaya of Mithila. It was a development of the classical Nyāya darśana. Other influences on Navya-Nyāya were the work of earlier philosophers Vācaspati Miśra (900–980 CE) and Udayana (late 10th century).

Gangeśa's book Tattvacintāmaṇi ("Thought-Jewel of Reality") was written partly in response to Śrīharśa's Khandanakhandakhādya, a defence of Advaita Vedānta, which had offered a set of thorough criticisms of Nyāya theories of thought and language. In his book, Gangeśa both addressed some of those criticisms and – more importantly – critically examined the Nyāya darśana himself. He held that, while Śrīharśa had failed successfully to challenge the Nyāya realist ontology, his and Gangeśa's own criticisms brought out a need to improve and refine the logical and linguistic tools of Nyāya thought, to make them more rigorous and precise.

Tattvacintāmani dealt with all the important aspects of Indian philosophy, logic, set theory, and especially epistemology, which Gangeśa examined rigorously, developing and improving the Nyāya scheme, and offering examples. The results, especially his analysis of cognition, were taken up and used by other darśanas.

Navya-Nyāya developed a sophisticated language and conceptual scheme that allowed it to raise, analyse, and solve problems in logic and epistemology. It systematised all the Nyāya concepts into four main categories: sense or perception (pratyakşa), inference (anumāna), comparison or similarity (upamāna), and testimony (sound or word; śabda).

This later school began around eastern India and Bengal, and developed theories resembling modern logic, such as Gottlob Frege's "distinction between sense and reference of proper names" and his "definition of number," as well as the Navya-Nyaya theory of "restrictive conditions for universals" anticipating some of the developments in modern set theory. Udayana in particular developed theories on "restrictive conditions for universals" and "infinite regress" that anticipated aspects of modern set theory. According to Kisor Kumar Chakrabarti:

Influence of Indian logic on modern logic
In the late 18th-century British scholars began to take an interest in Indian philosophy and discovered the sophistication of the Indian study of inference. This process culminated in Henry T. Colebrooke's The Philosophy of the Hindus: On the Nyaya and Vaisesika Systems in 1824, which provided an analysis of inference and comparison to the received Aristotelian logic, resulting in the observation that the Aristotelian syllogism could not account for the Indian syllogism. Max Mueller contributed an appendix to the 1853 edition of Thomson's Outline of the Laws of Thought, in which he placed Greek and Indian logic on the same plane: "The sciences of Logic and Grammar were, as far as history allows us to judge, invented or originally conceived by two nations only, by Hindus and Greeks."

Jonardon Ganeri has observed that this period saw George Boole (1815-1864) and Augustus De Morgan (1806-1871) make their pioneering applications of algebraic ideas to the formulation of logic (such as algebraic logic and Boolean logic), and has suggested that these figures were likely to be aware of these studies in xeno-logic, and further that their acquired awareness of the shortcomings of propositional logic are likely to have stimulated their willingness to look outside the system.

Indian logic attracted the attention of many Western scholars, and had an influence on pioneering 19th-century logicians such as Charles Babbage (1791-1871), Augustus De Morgan, and particularly George Boole, as confirmed by Boole's wife Mary Everest Boole in an "open letter to Dr Bose" titled "Indian Thought and Western Science in the Nineteenth Century" written in 1901.

De Morgan himself wrote in 1860 of the significance of Indian logic: "The two races which have founded the mathematics, those of the Sanskrit and Greek languages, have been the two which have independently formed systems of logic."

Mathematicians became aware of the influence of Indian mathematics on the European.  For example, Hermann Weyl wrote: "Occidental mathematics has in past centuries broken away from the Greek view and followed a course which seems to have originated in India and which has been transmitted, with additions, to us by the Arabs; in it the concept of number appears as logically prior to the concepts of geometry. [...] But the present trend in mathematics is clearly in the direction of a return to the Greek standpoint; we now look upon each branch of mathematics as determining its own characteristic domain of quantities."

See also

Tarka-Sangraha
Debates in ancient India
Seven valued logic

Notes

References
 Ganeri, Jonardon 2004. Indian Logic. in: Gabbay, Dov & Woods, John (eds.),Greek, Indian and Arabic Logic, Volume I of the Handbook of the History of Logic, Amsterdam: Elsevier, pp. 309–396.
 Ganeri, Jonardon (ed.) 2001. Indian Logic. A Reader. New York: Routledge Curzon.
 Matilal, Bimal Krishnan 1985. Logic, Language, and Reality. An Introduction to Indian Philosophical Studies.  Delhi: Motilal Barnassidas, 
 Matilal, Bimal Krishnan 1998. The Character of Logic in India, edited by Jonardon Ganeri and Heeraman Tiwari, Albany: State University of New York Press.
 Perrett, Roy (ed.) 2001. Logic and Language: Indian Philosophy, New York: Routledge.

External links

 Indian Logic and Ontology An annotated bibliography
 Aristotle and Gautama on Logic and Physics
 Asian Philosophy and Critical Thinking: Divergence or Convergence?
 Gillon, Brendan.  "Indian theories of inference (subscription)", in the Routledge Encyclopedia of Philosophy, 1998.
 Peckhaus, Volker. "Dignaga’s Logic of Invention".  In Ivor Grattan-Guinness, editor,  History of the Mathematical Sciences, 2004.
 V. V. S. Sarma. "Indian Systems of Logic (Nyaya): A Survey" (PDF).  Proc. Bombay Logic Conference'', 2005.
Vidhabhusana, Satis Chandra (1907). History of the Mediaeval School of Indian Logic. Calcutta University.

History of logic
Indian philosophy